The Battle of Tarpellanca (September 26, 1820) took place between the forces of nascent Chilean Army and Spanish royalist guerrillas, in the context of the Total War campaign, during the later stages of the Chilean War of Independence.

Background
After their victory at the Battle of Pangal, the Loyalist forces, composed of approximately 2,400 guerrilla and Mapuche Allies under the command of Vicente Benavides, decided to attack and destroy the city of Los Angeles. This city was defended by around 400 line soldiers under the command of Marshal Pedro Andrés del Alcázar, and had already survived four attempts by the same enemy.

At this juncture, Marshal del Alcázar received forged orders from General Ramón Freire to evacuate the city and move his forces to reinforce Chillán and meet with the main Army that was operating out of Concepción. Marshal del Alcázar, ignorant of the defeat suffered by the Patriot army at Pangal decided to evacuate the city, taking with him all the inhabitants, who otherwise would have been massacred by the guerrillas.  He left the city on the 25th at the head of the Cazadores de Coquimbo battalion, 50 artillery troops, approximately 150 friendly Mapuche allies and about a thousand civilians, with their properties and animals. The long train made for a very slow speed.

The battle
As he was crossing the Laja River at the Tarpellanca ford, early on the morning of the 26th, the column was attacked by the troops of Benavides at the point where the river branched into two inlets leaving an islet in the middle. Marshal del Alcázar and almost all of his column were trapped there at the islet. A defense was hastily organized by making a circle out of the carts, but after 13 hours of battle, just as night was falling, the patriots started to run out of ammunition.

In order to try to save the many civilians that were traveling with his column, he decided to negotiate with Benavides. The Patriots surrendered in exchange for their lives and free passage for all the civilians, while Marshal del Alcázar and his officers were to remain as hostages and the surviving soldiers were to incorporate themselves to the guerrilla. The final truce was agreed at 2AM on the 27th.

Aftermath
After the surrender of the troops, Benavides ordered the prisoners to restart the march towards Yumbel. On the morning of the 28th, Benavides ordered all the prisoners executed, which were then shot, lanced and the bodies torn apart. The city of Los Angeles was torched.

External links
Biography of Alcázar with details of the battle 
General information about Benavides

Sources

Conflicts in 1820
Battles involving Chile
Battles involving Spain
Battles involving the Mapuche
Battles of the Spanish American wars of independence
Battles of the Chilean War of Independence
Battles of the Total War Campaign
1820 in Chile
Battle of Tarpellanca
September 1820 events